is a water polo player from Japan. He appeared in the Japanese Reality TV series Terrace House: Boys × Girls Next Door (2012), episodes 75 - 98 which depicts his water polo training and in which he expresses his dream to one day represent Japan in the Olympics. He makes a cameo appearance in the Japanese movie Terrace House: Closing Door (2015) in which he outlines the necessary steps he and his team must take to qualify for entry to the 2016 Rio Olympics. He was part of the Japanese team at the 2016 Summer Olympics, where the team was eliminated in the group stage.

References

Japanese male water polo players
Living people
1989 births
Olympic water polo players of Japan
Water polo players at the 2016 Summer Olympics
Asian Games silver medalists for Japan
People from Toyama (city)
Sportspeople from Toyama Prefecture
Asian Games medalists in water polo
Water polo players at the 2014 Asian Games
Medalists at the 2014 Asian Games
20th-century Japanese people
21st-century Japanese people